Bharatiya Janata Party, Odisha (or BJP Odisha) (BJP;), 
is the state unit of the Bharatiya Janata Party in Odisha. Its head office is situated at the 4R-3/2, Unit-3, Janpath, Bhubaneswar-751 001 Odisha. The current President of BJP Odisha is Samir Mohanty.

Electoral performance

Lok Sabha Election

Legislative Assembly Election

Leadership

Leader of the Opposition

President

See also
Bharatiya Janata Party
National Democratic Alliance

References

Odisha
Political parties in Odisha